Casa Rio (also been known as the S.W. Stribley House) is a house that was built in 1926. It was designed by architects Henry Van Ryn and Gerrit de Gelleke in the Mission/Spanish Revival style.

Van Ryn and de Gelleke worked mostly in Wisconsin; the Charles W. Stribley House in Kaukauna, Wisconsin, built in 1910, is another of their works that is NRHP-listed. Since 2001 the home has been owned by AveXis founder and biotechnology executive John A. Carbona.

See also
Lee County Multiple Property Submission

References

Houses on the National Register of Historic Places in Florida
Mission Revival architecture in Florida
Houses completed in 1926
Buildings and structures in Fort Myers, Florida
Houses in Lee County, Florida
National Register of Historic Places in Lee County, Florida
1926 establishments in Florida